William Gordon may refer to:

British people
William Gordon, 2nd Earl of Aberdeen (1679–1746), Scottish peer, Tory politician and Jacobite
William Gordon, 6th Viscount of Kenmure (c. 1672–1716), Scottish Jacobite
William Gordon, Lord Strathnaver (1683–1720), MP for Tain Burghs, judged ineligible to sit because he was the eldest son of a Scottish peer
William Gordon (bishop of Aberdeen) (died 1577), last of the pre-Reformation bishops of Aberdeen owing allegiance to the Roman Catholic Church
William Gordon (bishop of Leeds) (1831–1911), English prelate of the Roman Catholic Church
William Gordon (physician) (1801–1849), physician and Fellow of the Linnean Society of London
William Gordon (Royal Navy officer, born 1705) (1705–1769), became Commander-in-Chief, The Nore in 1762
William Gordon (Royal Navy officer, born 1784) (1784–1858), Scottish vice-admiral, naval commander and politician
William Eagleson Gordon (1866–1941), Scottish recipient of the Victoria Cross
William Gordon (British Army officer) (1736–1816), British general and politician
William Gordon (Chelsea MP) (1818–1894), British Member of Parliament for Chelsea, 1874–1880
Lord William Gordon (1744–1823), MP for Elginshire, Inverness-shire, and Horsham
Sir William Gordon, 1st Baronet (died 1742), MP for Sutherland, Cromartyshire and Nairnshire
William Gordon (Rochester MP) (c. 1735–1776), MP for Rochester
Sir William Duff-Gordon, 2nd Baronet (1772–1823), known as William Gordon until 1815, Scottish politician
William McD. Gordon (1899–1950), Provost of Peterhead, 1946–1950
Sir William Gordon (diplomat) (1726–1798), British diplomat and politician, MP for Portsmouth
William Thomas Gordon (1884–1950), British palaeontologist and palaeobotanist

American people
William Gordon (New Hampshire politician) (1763–1802), United States Representative from New Hampshire
William Gordon (Ohio politician) (1862–1942), U.S. Representative from Ohio
William E. Gordon (1918–2010), physicist and astronomer, "father of the Arecibo Observatory"
William F. Gordon (1787–1858), U.S. Representative from Virginia
William Washington Gordon (1796–1842), American politician and railroad executive, founder Central of Georgia Railroad
William Gordon (bishop of Alaska) (1918–1994), bishop of the Episcopal Diocese of Alaska, 1948–1974
William J. J. Gordon (1919–2003), inventor and psychologist
William D. Gordon (politician) (1858–1917), politician and attorney from Michigan
William Osceola Gordon (1837–1914), American judge
William Washington Gordon II (1834–1912), Confederate officer, later a U.S. Army general
William D. Gordon (actor) (1918–1991), American actor, writer and director

Others
George William Gordon (1820–1865), Jamaican politician
William James Gordon (1864–1922), West Indian recipient of the Victoria Cross
William Gordon (Australian politician) (1862–1943), Australian politician
William Deuchar Gordon (1871–1951), Australian pastoralist
Billy Gordon, Australian politician

See also
William Gordon-Cumming (disambiguation)